Hōri Pukehika (23 March 1851– 30 May 1932) was a New Zealand tribal leader and carver. Of Māori descent, he was born in Pipiriki, New Zealand. His father was Te Wikirini Te Tua of Te Āti Haunui-a-Pāpārangi iwi, while his mother was Peti Te Oiroa of Ngāti Pāmoana. Hōri Pukehika is best known for creating the entrance of the model pā at the New Zealand International Exhibition in Christchurch in 1906–7.

References

1851 deaths
1932 deaths
New Zealand woodcarvers
Te Āti Haunui-a-Pāpārangi people
New Zealand Māori carvers